Catherine Ferguson (1779 – July 11, 1854) was an African-American philanthropist and educator who founded the first Sunday school in New York City.

Early life
Ferguson was born into slavery in 1779, while her mother, Katy Williams, was being transported from Virginia to New York City. After her mother was sold as a slave when Catherine was eight years old, she never had the chance to see her again.  Ferguson referred to their master, a Presbyterian elder, only by the initials "R. B.", in order "to conceal his identity" and to prevent embarrassment from his own family. Her separation from her mother became her inspiration for helping children later in her life.

At about the age of sixteen or seventeen, a female friend bought Ferguson her freedom for US$200, an amount that she had to repay over a period of six years. But the original agreement was changed later: instead of repayment of the sum, Ferguson's benefactor decided to accept her offer of serving the "lady of the city" for eleven months, which became the equivalent of US$100. The remaining half was raised by Divie Bethune, a merchant in New York. Afterwards, Ferguson became a baker of cakes sold for "weddings and parties".

Ferguson married at the age of eighteen. She bore two children who both died during their infancy. She died of cholera at her home in 1854, at about 75 years of age.

As an educator
She believed that every child should be educated & safe. Although illiterate, Ferguson took care of poor and neglected black and white children in her neighborhood.  Every Sunday, she brought these children to her home on Warren Street, New York, in order to provide them with religious education.  From her house, and through the encouragement of a local minister, Rev. Dr. John Mitchell Mason of the Associate Reformed Church, her Sunday School was moved to the basement of a church - where there was a lecture room - on Murray Street in about 1814.  Because of her illiteracy, Ferguson was unable to write about her experiences in early America, thus being seldom mentioned by historians, but she was described to have responded to "the needs of the poor in an era which the poor were notably neglected".  Later on, her school became known as the Murray Street Sabbath School.  Ferguson's teaching instructions included the memorization of hymns and Scripture.  Among Ferguson's visitors to the school were Isabella Graham and Reverend Isaac Ferris.

Apart from her efforts in educating children, Ferguson also held prayer meetings for children and adults twice a week, a work that went on for more than 40 years.  She also took care of 48 children she had gathered "from the streets or from the unfit parents" until she was able to find "suitable homes for them".

Recognition
Ferguson gained a degree of prominence during her lifetime because of her charitable work, as evidenced by the attention she received from the press when she died. Examples were the notice about her death in The New York Times on July 13, 1854, and a brief biography published by the Tribune on July 20, 1854. As a tribute to her work, the Katy Ferguson Home for unwed mothers was established in New York in 1920. Ferguson was also included among 330 notable persons in a biographical dictionary of Benson J. Lossing.

References

African-American educators
American educators
Educators from New York City
Philanthropists from New York (state)
History of New York (state)
1779 births
1854 deaths
19th-century American people